A Giant crab is a type of crustacean.

Giant crab may refer to:
Japanese spider crab (Macrocheira kaempferi), possesses the longest leg span of any marine crab species alive
Coconut crab (Birgus latro), the largest terrestrial invertebrate species alive
Tasmanian giant crab (Pseudocarcinus gigas), another large crab species

See also 
 Giant Enemy Crab, a 2006 Internet meme
 A Giant Crab Comes Forth debut album by Giant Crab (band)

Animal common name disambiguation pages